{{Infobox
| title = Converts to Christianity from Islam
| headerstyle = background:#efefef
| header1 = Total population
| data2   ='Between 8.4 million (2014 study) - 10.2 million (2015 study) 
According to the study 6 million of those converts came from Indonesia; however, the 6 million figure also includes descendants of those converts.
 Significant numbers of Muslims convert to Christianity in: Afghanistan, Albania, Algeria, Australia, Austria, Azerbaijan, Bangladesh, Bulgaria, Burkina Faso, Belgium,  Bosnia and Herzegovina, Bulgaria, Canada, Ethiopia, France, Ghana, Georgia (Abkhazia), Germany, India (Kashmir), Iran, Iraq, Kenya, Kosovo, Kyrgyzstan, Malaysia, Morocco, the Netherlands, Nigeria, Russia, Saudi Arabia, Singapore, Syria, Sweden, Tanzania, Tajikistan, Tunisia, Turkey, United Kingdom, the United States, Uzbekistan, and other countries.
}}

HistorySection contains alphabetical listing of converts from earlier times until the end of the 19th centuryA

 Abo of Tiflis – Christian activist and the patron saint of the city of Tbilisi, Georgia
 Abraham of Bulgaria – martyr and saint of the Russian Orthodox Church
 St. Adolphus  –  martyr who was put to death along with his brother, John, by Abd ar-Rahman II, the Caliph of Córdoba, for apostasy
 Jabalah ibn al-Aiham – last ruler of the Ghassanid state in Syria and Jordan in the 7th century AD; after the Islamic conquest of Levant he converted to Islam in AD 638; later reverted to Christianity and lived in Anatolia until he died in AD 645
 Leo Africanus – Moorish diplomat who was converted to Christianity following his capture.
 Safdar Ali – former Maulvi (cleric) from India
 Saint Hodja Amiris – former Ottoman soldier stationed in Jerusalem who converted to Christianity in the 17th century and was subsequently tortured and killed for the crime of apostasy in Islam
 Avraamy Aslanbegov – Russian-Azeri vice-admiral and military writer of the Russian Empire, converted to Eastern Orthodox Christianity
 Aurelius and Natalia – martyrs who were put to death during the reign of Abd ar-Rahman II, Caliph of Córdoba for apostasy
 Anemas - Son of the last Emir of Crete Abd al-Aziz ibn Shu'ayb. He converted to Christianity and joined the Byzantine army as a member of the imperial bodyguard.

B
 Simeon Bekbulatovich – Khan of Qasim Khanate
 Alexander Bekovich-Cherkassky – Russian officer of Circassian origin who led the first Russian military expedition into Central Asia
 Sayed Borhan Khan – Khan of Qasim Khanate from 1627 to 1679; was forced to convert to Christianity by Russian forces following the Siege of Kazan
 Bulus ibn Raja' – converted to the Coptic Orthodox Church and wrote the Kitab al-wadih bi-l-haqq, a critique of Islam

C

 Chehab family – refer to Shihab dynasty under "S" in same section
 Constantine the African – Baghdad-educated Muslim who died in 1087 as a Christian monk at Monte Cassino
 Constantine Hagarit – born in Smyrna to a Muslim family under the Ottoman Empire during the 19th century; converted to Orthodox Christianity and was subsequently imprisoned, tortured and executed by hanging for apostasy on 2 June 1819
 Converso – substantial numbers of Iberian Muslims who converted to Catholicism in Spain or Portugal, particularly during the 14th and 15th centuries. These New Christians of Moorish Berber origin were known as Moriscos. Over 1 million of these Moriscos were converted from Islam to Christianity, many of them by force, but many also became sincere and devout believers.

E
 Eleni of Ethiopia – Empress of Ethiopia, forcibly married and converted to Christianity by Kewstantinos I after his invasion of Hadiya.
 Estevanico – Berber originally from Morocco and one of the early explorers of the Southwestern United States

G
 George XI of Kartli – Georgian monarch who ruled Eastern Georgia from 1676 to 1688 and again from 1703 to 1709; an Eastern Orthodox Christian, he converted to Islam prior to his appointment as governor of Qandahar; later converted to Roman Catholicism
 George of Hungary ( 1422–1502) – Ottoman slave that escaped and reverted back from Islam to Christianity.

H
 Umar ibn Hafsun – leader of anti-Ummayad dynasty forces in southern Iberia; converted to Christianity with his sons and ruled over several mountain valleys for nearly forty years, having the castle Bobastro as his residence

J
 Don Juan of Persia (1560–1604) –  late 16th- and early 17th-century figure in Iran and Spain; also known as Faisal Nazary; was a native of Iran, who later moved westward; settled in Spain where he became a Roman Catholic
 Jesse of Kakheti – Georgian prince of the Bagrationi dynasty, son of King Leon of Kakheti converted to Islam in the Service of the Safavid dynasty, but returned to Orthodox Christianity after his return to Georgia
 Jesse of Kartli – Georgian prince of the Bagrationi dynasty  (from Christianity to Islam back to Christianity)

K
 Alexander Kazembek – Russian Orientalist, historian and philologist of Azeri origin

L

 Imad ud-din Lahiz – prolific Islamic writer, preacher and Qur'anic translator

M
 Sake Dean Mahomed (born Sheikh Din Muhammad) – Indian traveller, surgeon and entrepreneur who introduced the Indian take-away curry house restaurant in Britain; first Indian to have written a book in the English language;Sake Dean Mahomet (1759-1851) converted to marry Jane Daly, an Irish Protestant, as it was illegal for a non-Protestant to marry a Protestant. Later became a devout follower.
 Enrique de Malaca – Malay slave of Ferdinand Magellan, converted to Roman Catholicism after being purchased in 1511Sejarawan Universitas Harvard: Penjelajah Bumi Pertama adalah Putera Melayu
 Abdul Masih – Indian indigenous missionary; ordained Anglican and Lutheran minister; Abdul Masih (1765 - 1827) An influential indigenous Indian missionary often referred to as the most influential indigenous Christian to shape nineteenth-century Christian missions in India; religious author
 Ahmed ibn Merwan – Seljek Turk lieutenant during the First Crusade. He converted to Christianity sometime after surrendering Antioch to the Crusaders.
 Mizse – last Palatine of King Ladislaus IV of Hungary in 1290; born into a Muslim family in Tolna County in the Kingdom of Hungary; converted to Roman Catholicism
 St. George El Mozahem – Coptic saint
 Şehzade Murad - Son of Cem Sultan; converted to Christianity and changed his name to Pierre

N
 Aurelius and Natalia (died 852) –  Christian martyrs who were put to death during the reign of Abd ar-Rahman II, Emir of Córdoba, and are counted among the Martyrs of Córdoba; Aurelius was the son of a Muslim father and a Christian mother. He was also secretly a follower of Christianity, as was his wife Natalia, who was also the child of a Muslim father.
 Ibrahim Njoya – Bamum king; back and forth conversions from Islam to Christianity
 Nunilo and Alodia – 9th-century sisters recognized as Catholic saints and martyrs in Moorish Spain, executed for apostasy for converting to Christianity

Q
 Qays al-Ghassani  –  a Christian Arab of the 10 century, from Najran, southern Arabia. He converted to Islam in his youth. He later reverted to Christianity and became a monk. He was tried at Ramla for apostacy but refused to return to Islam and was beheaded.

R
 Ștefan Răzvan – Gypsy prince who ruled Moldavia for six months in 1595
 Emily Ruete – Zanzibari princess born as Salama bint Said 

S

 Omar ibn Said – writer and scholar of Islam, enslaved and deported from present-day Senegal to the United States in 1807, formally converted to Christianity in 1820, though appears to have remained at least partially Muslim.
 Begum Samru – powerful lady of north India, ruling a large area from Sardhana, Uttar Pradesh
 The Sibirsky family – foremost of many Genghisid (Shaybanid) noble families formerly living in Russia[Russia's Orient: Imperial Borderlands and Peoples, 1700-1917] p.25
 Shihab family or alternatively Chehab family – prominent Lebanese noble family; having converted from Sunni Islam, the religion of his predecessors, to Christianity at the end of the 18th century. Descendants were Maronite rulers of the Emirate of Mount LebanonIvan Mannheim, Syria & Lebanon handbook, Footprint Travel Guides, 2001, Google Print, p. 567.
 Bashir Shihab II – Lebanese emir (prince) who ruled Ottoman Lebanon in the first half of the 19th century; his family was Sunni Muslim; some of them converted to Maronite Catholic Christianity at the end of the 18th century[The Maronites in history, Matti Moosa, p283]Harris 2012, p. 134.
 Skanderbeg – Albanian military leader; was forcibly converted to Islam from Christianity, but reverted to Christianity later in life
 Maria Aurora von Spiegel (born Fatima) – Turkish mistress of Augustus II the Strong and the wife of a Polish noble

T

 Tabaraji of Ternate – Indonesian sultan; converted to Roman Catholicism after 1534 and baptised with the name Dom ManuelTernate Sultanat 
 Casilda of Toledo – daughter of a Muslim king of Toledo (called Almacrin or Almamun); became ill as a young woman and traveled to northern Iberia to partake of the healing waters of the shrine of San Vicente; when she was cured, she was baptized at Burgos; venerated as a saint of the Catholic Church
Conrad Tillard (born 1964) - Baptist minister, radio host, author, civil rights activist, and politician; converted first to Islam, and then back to Christianity

U
 Ubayd-Allah ibn Jahsh (Arabic: عبيد الله بن جحش) – brother of Zaynab bint Jahsh, brother in law and first cousin of Muhammad and one of the male Sahaba (companions of the Prophet); he has been cited as one of the four monotheistic hanifs by Ibn Ishaq who converted to Christianity after his migration to Abyssinia
 Utameshgaray of Kazan – Khan of Kazan Khanate; was forced to convert to Christianity following the Siege of Kazan

X
 Muley Xeque (Arabic:  مولاي الشيخ Mawlay al-Shaykh) –  Moroccan prince, born in Marrakech in 1566; exiled in Spain, he converted to Roman Catholicism in Madrid and was known as Philip of Africa or Philip of Austria

Y
 Yadegar Moxammat of Kazan – last khan of Kazan Khanate

Z
 Zaida of Seville –  born an Iberian Muslim; when Seville fell to the Almoravids, she fled to the protection of Alfonso VI of Castile, becoming his mistress, converting to Christianity and taking the baptismal name of Isabel
 Zayd Abu Zayd – the last Almohad governor of Valencia, Spain; remained a loyal ally of James I; in 1236 he converted to Roman Catholicism, adopting the name of Vicente Bellvis, a fact which he kept secret until the fall of Valencia
 Abu'l-Maghra ibn Musa ibn Zurara - last Zurarid emir of Arzen

20th and 21st century

A
 Aslan Abashidze – this former leader of the Ajarian Autonomous Republic in western Georgia was born into a renowned Muslim Ajarian family, but later he converted to Christianity.
 Basuki Abdullah – Indonesian painter; converted to Roman Catholicism
 Saeed Abedini – Iranian-American pastor imprisoned in Iran, Abedini is an American and a former Muslim who converted to Christianity in 2000
 Taysir Abu Saada – this former member of the PLO founded the ministry Hope For Ishmael after he converted to Christianity;Yasir Arafat's personal driver
 Rotimi Adebari – first Black mayor in Ireland
 Inaara Aga Khan – second wife of Aga Khan IV who returned to her Christian faith adopting her birth name "Gabriele" after the completion of their divorce.
 Mehmet Ali Ağca – Turkish assassin who murdered left-wing journalist Abdi İpekçi on 1 February 1979; later shot and wounded Pope John Paul II on 13 May 1981; while in prison in 2007 he claimed to convert to Christianity
 Magdi Allam (baptized as Magdi Cristiano Allam) – Italy's most famous Islamic affairs journalist
 Zachariah Anani – former Sunni Muslim Lebanese militia fighter
 Juan Andrés – name chosen by a Spanish Muslim scholar who converted to Catholicism and wrote a well known polemical work against Islam, the Confusión o confutación de la secta mahomética y del Alcorán Matthew Ashimolowo – Nigerian-born British pastor and evangelist
 Asmirandah – Indonesian actress of Dutch descent; converted to Protestantism in December 2013; owes her conversion to an experience of having dreamed three times of Jesus ChristMy religion is my own rightTestimony Asmirandah "Indonesian Artist"
 Johannes Avetaranian – born Muhammad Shukri Efendi, Christian missionary of Turkish heritage

B

 Parveen Babi – former Indian actress and an erstwhile fashion model;  born in Junagadh, Gujarat to a Muslim family, and later converted to Christianity during the last years of her life, and was baptised in a Protestant Anglican church at Malabar Hill
 Tunde Bakare –  Pentecostal pastor and Nigerian politician.
 Josephine Bakhita – Roman Catholic saint from Darfur, Sudan. She was forcibly converted to Islam – "Sister Josephine Bakhita had been converted by force to Islam and then, freedom restored, had chosen Christianity". On 9 January 1890 Bakhita was baptised with the names of Josephine Margaret and Fortunata.
 Sarah Balabagan – Filipina prisoner in the United Arab Emirates, 1994-96
 Fathima Rifqa Bary – American teenager of Sri Lankan descent who drew international attention in 2009 when she ran away from home and claimed that her Muslim parents might kill her for having converted to Christianity
 Sheikh Ahmed Barzani – head of Barzani Tribe in Iraqi Kurdistan and older brother of Mustafa Barzani, Kurdish nationalist leader; announced his conversion to Christianity in 1931 during the anti-government uprising
 Mohammed Christophe Bilek – Algerian former Muslim who lives in France since 1961; baptized Roman Catholic in 1970; in the 1990s, he founded Our Lady of Kabyle, a French website devoted to evangelisation among Muslims
 Francis Bok – Sudanese-American activist, convert to Islam from Christianity; but later returned to his Christian faith
 Jean-Bédel Bokassa – Central African Republic Emperor (from Christianity to Islam back to Christianity)
 Thomas Boni Yayi – Beninese banker and politician who has been President of Benin since 2006; originally from a Muslim family; is now an Evangelical Protestant
 Broery – Indonesian singer (from Christianity to Islam back to Christianity)

C

 Moussa Dadis Camara – ex-officer of the Guinean army who served as the president of the Republic of Guinea; Roman Catholic Christian convert from Islam"Qui est Moussa Dadis Camara, le nouveau president de la Guinee?" , Guineenews, 26 December 2008 .
 Rianti Cartwright – Indonesian actress, model, presenter and VJ; two weeks before departure to the United States to get married, she left Islam to become a baptized Catholic with the name Sophia Rianti Rhiannon Cartwrighthttp://img408.imageshack.us/img408/2461/pamfletrianticartwright.jpg perkawinan katolik
 Chamillionaire (born Hakeem Seriki) – American rapper Born A Muslim But later Converted To Christianity On religion: "I go to church every Sunday I'm in Houston. Now I have people asking for autographs in church. It's crazy, but yeah, I still do that and I still pay tithes and all that stuff."
 Djibril Cissé – French international footballer
 Hansen Clarke – U.S. Representative for 
 Eldridge Cleaver – initially associated with the Nation of Islam, then Evangelical Christianity, then Mormonism
 Michał Czajkowski – Polish-Cossack writer and political emigre who worked both for the resurrection of Poland and the reestablishment of a Cossack Ukraine

D
 Justinus Darmojuwono – first Indonesian Cardinal of the Roman Catholic Church; served as Archbishop of Semarang from 1963 to 1981, and was elevated to the cardinalate in 1967; converted to Catholicism in 1932
 Nonie Darwish – Egyptian-American writer, human rights activist, critic of Islam, founder of Arabs for Israel, director of Former Muslims United
 Hassan Dehqani-Tafti – first ethnic Persian to become a Christian bishop of Iran since the 7th century and the Islamic conquest of Persia
 Mehdi Dibaj – Iranian Christian convert from Shia Islam, pastor and Christian martyrhttps://www.independent.co.uk/news/people/obituary-mehdi-dibaj-1412186.html Obituary: Mehdi Dibaj
 Manohara Odelia Pinot – Indonesian model and actress of mixed caucasian and Indonesian Bugis ancestry & former wife of Malaysian Kelantanese prince, Tengku Muhammad Fakhry Petra.
 Momolu Dukuly – Liberian politician; became the second foreign minister under William V.S. Tubman Tolerance: The Key To Protecting Liberia’s Christian-Muslim Harmony
 Daniel Bambang Dwi Byantoro – leader (and Archimandrite) of the Indonesian Orthodox Churchhttp://www.orthodoxresearchinstitute.org/articles/church_history/byantoro_indonesia.htm The birth of the Orthodox Church in Indonesia
 Ibn al-Dahhak

E

 Bahaa el-Din Ahmed Hussein el-Akkad – Egyptian former Muslim sheikh whose theological discourse with a Christian led him to conduct an intensive study of Christian Scripture, after which he converted to Christianity in January 2005
 Mohammed Elewonibi – Nigerian-Canadian football player
 Soraya Esfandiary-Bakhtiari – second wife and Queen Consort of Mohammad Reza Pahlavi, the late Shah of Iran who converted to Roman Catholicism

F
 Joseph Fadelle (born Mohammed al-Sayyid al-Moussawi) –  Roman Catholic convert from Islam and writer born in 1964 in Iraq to a Shiite familyLe Prix à payer, L’Œuvre, 2010
 Rima Fakih – Lebanese-American actress, model, professional wrestler and beauty pageant titleholder; Miss USA 2010; converted to Maronite Christianity
 Donald Fareed – Iranian televangelist and minister
 Hazem Farraj – Palestinian-American  writer, minister, and televangelist

G
 Mark A. Gabriel – Egyptian Islamic scholar and writer
 Daveed Gartenstein-Ross – counter-terrorism expert and attorney (from Judaism to Islam to Christianity)Daveed Gartenstein-Ross  biography on his website
 Kabeer Gbaja-Biamila – American football defensive end who was drafted by the Green Bay Packers and is currently a free agent
 Kiki Fatmala - Arab Indonesian actress.
 Ruffa Gutierrez – Filipina actress, model and former beauty queen (from Christianity to Islam back to Christianity)

H

I
 Tunch Ilkin – former Turkish American football player
 Qadry Ismail – former American football player
 Raghib Ismail – former American football player

J
 Sabatina James (born 1982) – born in Dhedar, Pakistan; Austrian-Pakistani book author; started a new life in Vienna, changing her name and converting to Catholicism; baptized in 2006
 Esther John – born to a Pakistani Muslim family; converted to Christianity; became a nurse to rural communities in Northern India and was later murdered
 Mario Joseph –  born into a Muslim family, he became a notable Imam before the age of 18, but subsequently converted to Catholicism whereupon he was tortured and forced to flee to Europe
 Lina Joy – Malay convert from Islam to Christianity; born Azlina Jailani in 1964 in Malaysia to Muslim parents of Javanese descent; converted at age 26; in 1998, she was baptized, and applied to have her conversion legally recognized by the Malaysian courts

K
 Emir Kusturica – Serbian and Yugoslavian filmmaker and actor

L
 Dr. Nur Luke – Uyghur Bible translator
 Fernão Lopes (soldier) –  16th-century Portuguese soldier in India who converted to Roman Catholicism
 Yusuf Lule – President of Uganda between 13 April and 20 June 1979

M
 Pinkan Mambo (born Pinkan Ratnasari Mambo) – Indonesian singer; converted in 2010; decision taken after admitting she studied various religions of the world and eventually dropped in awe of Jesus Christ Pinkan Mambo married in a church in Los Angeles
 Fadhma Aït Mansour – mother of French writers Jean Amrouche and Taos Amrouche
 Roy Marten (born Wicasksono Abdul Salam) –  Indonesian actor whose family was converted to Roman Catholicism during his childhood  but who converted later to Indonesian Orthodoxy in 1997Roy Marten, who said that he has been a follower of the Church for three years  diakses 3 February 2006
 Josef Mässrur (born Ghäsim Khan) – missionary to Chinese Turkestan with the Mission Union of Sweden
 Carlos Menem – former President of Argentina; raised a Nusayri but converted to Roman Catholicism, a constitutional requirement for accessing the presidency until 1994
 Archbishop Thomas Luke Msusa – born into a Muslim family; converted to Christianity as a child and later became an archbishop in his home country of Malawi, as well as converting and baptizing his father, a former imam
 Muhsin Muhammad – current American football player for the Carolina Panthers, raised in a Muslim household, later converted to Christianity
 Paul Mulla – Turkish scholar and professor of Islamic Studies at the Pontifical Oriental Institute

N
 Youcef Nadarkhani – Iranian Christian pastor who has been sentenced to death for apostasy
 Diana Nasution – Indonesian singer, converted to Protestantism after marriagehttp://life.viva.co.id/news/read/449316-rita-nasution-dan-minggus-tahitoe-berduet-di-depan-peti-diana Walau saya Muslim, Hajah saya tetap bisa menyanyikan semua lagu.
 Marina Nemat – Canadian author of Iranian descent and former political prisoner of the Iranian government; born into a Christian family, she converted to Islam in order to avoid execution but later reverted to Christianity

O
 Malika Oufkir –  Moroccan writer and daughter of General Mohamed Oufkir; she and her siblings are converts from Islam to Catholicism  and she writes in her book, Stolen Lives, "we had rejected Islam, which had brought us nothing good, and opted for Catholicism instead".

P
 Shams Pahlavi – Iranian princess and the elder sister of Mohammad Reza Pahlavi, Shah of Iran
 Sharena Gunawan – Indonesian actress and model. Converted to Christianity after remarried with Indonesian actor Ryan Delon Situmeang.
 Hamid Pourmand – former Iranian army colonel and lay leader of the Jama'at-e Rabbani, the Iranian branch of the Assemblies of God church in Iran

Q
 Nabeel Qureshi – former Ahmadiyya Muslim; converted to Evangelical Christianity in 2005; became an internationally recognized apologist with Ravi Zacharias International Ministries

R
 Daud Rahbar – Pakistani scholar of Comparative religions, composer, short story writer, translator, philosopher, contributor to inter-civilization dialogue, musicologist, drummer, singer and guitaristhttp://www.themuslimtimes.org/2013/10/countries/united-states/exiled-writer-educator-dr-daud-rahbar-passed-away-in-florida Exiled writer, educator Dr Daud Rahbar passed away in Florida
 Abdul Rahman – Afghan convert to Christianity who escaped the death penalty because of foreign pressure
 Brother Rachid – Moroccan Christian convert from Islam; hosts a weekly live call-in show on AL-Hayat channel
 Majeed Rashid Mohammed – Kurdish Christian convert from Islam; established a network with former Kurdish Muslims with about 2,000 members today
 Dewi Rezer – Indonesian model of French descent; converted to Roman Catholicism Menikah di Bali, Dewi Rezer & Marcelino Seperti Mimpi
 Emily Ruete (born Sayyida Salme) – Princess of Zanzibar and OmanEmily Ruete, Ulrich Haarmann (Editor), E. Van Donzel (Editor), Leiden, Netherlands, (1992): An Arabian Princess Between Two Worlds: Memoirs, Letters Home, Sequels to the Memoirs, Syrian Customs and Usages. Presents the reader with a picture of life in Zanzibar between 1850 – 1865, and with an intelligent observer's reactions to life in Germany in the Bismarck period. Emily Ruete's writings describe her attempts to recover her Zanzibar inheritance and her homesickness. 

S

 Nazli Sabri – Queen consort of Egypt; converted to Catholicism in 1950 and took the name "Mary Elizabeth"
 Kyai Sadrach – Indonesian missionaryhttp://biokristi.sabda.org/kiai_sadrach Makna Sumbangan Komunitas Sadrach bagi Upaya Kontekstualisasi Gereja
 Lukman Sardi – Indonesian actor .
 Rev. Manigun Sayed – Muslim convert in Manipur (born in 1965 and converted to Christianity in 1985), from Manipur, India 
 Mohamed Alí Seineldín – former Argentine army colonel who participated in two failed coup attempts against the democratically elected governments of both President Raúl Alfonsín and President Carlos Menem in 1988 and 1990
 Bilquis Sheikh – Pakistani author and Christian missionary
 Walid Shoebat – American author and former member of the PLO
 Nasir Siddiki – Canadian evangelist, author, and business consultant
 Amir Sjarifuddin – Indonesian socialist leader who later became the prime minister of Indonesia during its National Revolution
 James Scurry – British soldier and statesman
 Rudolf Carl von Slatin – Anglo-Austrian soldier and administrator in the Sudan
 Albertus Soegijapranata – born in Surakarta, Dutch East Indies, to a Muslim courtier and his wife who later converted to Catholicism; the first native Indonesian bishop; known for his pro-nationalistic stance, often expressed as "100% Catholic, 100% Indonesian"
 Patrick Sookhdeo – British Anglican canon

T
 Hakan Taştan and Turan Topal – two Turkish Christian converts who went on trial in 2006, on charges of "allegedly insulting 'Turkishness' and inciting religious hatred against Islam"
 Hary Tanoesoedibjo – Indonesian politician and businessmanhttp://www.orangterkayaindonesia.com/profil-hary-tanoesoedibjo-orang-super-kaya-di-indonesia/   Profil Hary Tanoesoedibjo dan Perjalanan Kesuksesannya
 Maria Temryukovna – Circassian princess, and second wife to Ivan IV of Russia; born in a Muslim upbringing; baptised into the Russian Orthodox Church on 21 August 1561
 Aman Tuleyev – Russian governor of Kemerovo Oblast

U
 Udo Ulfkotte – German journalist who was born a Christian, became an atheist, then converted to Islam and finally converted back to Christianity
 Lyasan Utiasheva – Russian gymnast, convert to Eastern Orthodox ChristianityЛяйсан Утяшева пишет стихи — Комсомольская правда, 29 мая 2009

V
 Erion Veliaj - Albanian politician, current Mayor of Tirana. Converted to Evangelicalism after contact with missionaries from the United States.
 Julia Volkova – Russian singer and actress best known as a member of the Russian pop duo, t.A.T.u.

W
 George Weah – Liberian soccer player (from Christianity to Islam back to Christianity)
 Munira Wilson - British member of parliament for Twickenham. Raised as a Muslim but converted to Christianity
 Sigi Wimala – Indonesian model and actress, converted to Catholicism after marriage
 Ibrahim Tunggul Wulung – Indonesian evangelist and missionaryhttp://www.persee.fr/web/revues/home/prescript/article/arch_0044-8613_1979_num_17_1_1463 Karangjoso revisité: aux origines du christianisme à Java central
 Wu'erkaixi – Uyghur dissident known for his leading role during the Tiananmen protests of 1989

X

Y
 Mosab Hassan Yousef – son of a Hamas leader
 Nania Kurniawati Yusuf – Indonesian singer, finalist of the first season of Indonesian Idol'', 2004

Z
 Saye Zerbo – President of the Republic of Upper Volta (now Burkina Faso)

References

See also
 List of converts to Christianity
 List of former Muslims
 List of converts to Islam from Christianity

Christianity from Islam
Christianity